Jhon Firth Ornai Liu de Oliveira (born 17 July 2001) is an East Timorese professional footballer who plays as a midfielder for SLB Laulara. On 5 December 2021 he made his debut for the Timor-Leste national football team in the opening group A match of the 2020 AFF Championship against Thailand.

International goals

References

Living people
2001 births
East Timorese footballers
Timor-Leste international footballers
Association football midfielders
Competitors at the 2021 Southeast Asian Games
Southeast Asian Games competitors for East Timor